The Robert Award for Best Long Fiction/Animation  is one of the merit awards presented by the Danish Film Academy at the annual Robert Awards ceremony. The award has been handed out since 2007.

Honorees

2000s 
 2007:  – 
 2008:  – Martin de Thurah
 2009:  – Christian Tafdrup

2010s 
 2010: Bobby – Julie Bille
 2011: Limboland – Jeremy Weller
 2012:  – Asger K. Kallesøe
 2013:  – 
 2014:  – Johan Stahl Winthereik
 2015:  – Caroline Sascha Cogez

References

External links 
  

2007 establishments in Denmark
Animation awards
Awards established in 2007
Fiction Animation, long